Two Japanese destroyers have been named :

See also 
 Kagerō

Imperial Japanese Navy ship names
Japanese Navy ship names